DeKalb Junction is a hamlet and census-designated place located in the town of DeKalb in Saint Lawrence County, New York, United States. Its population was 519 as of the 2010 census. DeKalb Junction has a post office with ZIP code 13630. U.S. Route 11 passes through the community.

Geography

References

Hamlets in St. Lawrence County, New York
Hamlets in New York (state)
Census-designated places in St. Lawrence County, New York
Census-designated places in New York (state)